"Red Socks Pugie" is the third single from the album Antidotes by Foals. It is their sixth single in total to date. It was released as a digital download, CD and vinyl on 9 June 2008.

Lead singer Yannis Philippakis stated that the track was about "the amazing energy, the flows you feel when you're in love, or you think you are".

The video was directed by Dave Ma and features footage of the band near a lake, nuclear weapon test explosions and medical animations.

"Red Socks Pugie" peaked at number 89 on the UK Singles Chart. The song was used by ITV during their coverage of the FA Cup during the 2009-10 football season.

Formats and track listings

References

External links
Official website

2008 singles
Foals songs
2008 songs
Transgressive Records singles
Songs written by Yannis Philippakis